Jitendra Kumar Rai is an Indian politician. He is a Minister of Art, Culture & Youth Department, Government of Bihar & member of Bihar Legislative Assembly from Marhaura. He is 3 times MLA (From 2010 to date). His father also served as a member of Bihar Legislative Assembly Yadubanshi Rai twice from this constituency.

References

Bihar MLAs 2010–2015
Bihar MLAs 2015–2020
Bihar MLAs 2020–2025
Living people
Janata Dal (United) politicians
1978 births
Rashtriya Janata Dal politicians
People from Saran district